Luca Zamparo (born 19 November 1994) is an Italian football player. He plays for  club Virtus Entella.

Club career
He made his professional Serie C debut for Triestina on 25 March 2012 in a game against Südtirol.

He played the first 9 seasons of his senior career in Serie C and Serie D.

After becoming the second-best goalscorer in 2018–19 Serie D group D and helping his team Reggiana with promotion to Serie C, on 10 July 2019 he signed a 3-year contract with Serie A club Parma, who immediately loaned him to Serie C club Rimini.

On 8 January 2020, Parma announced that the loan to Rimini has been terminated and he has been loaned back to Reggiana for the rest of the season. The loan contract contained the obligation for Reggiana to purchase his rights which were activated after his first league appearance for them.

On 5 August 2022, Zamparo moved to Virtus Entella.

References

External links
 

1994 births
People from Latisana
Footballers from Friuli Venezia Giulia
Living people
Italian footballers
Association football forwards
U.S. Triestina Calcio 1918 players
S.S.D. Varese Calcio players
FeralpiSalò players
A.C. Cuneo 1905 players
A.C. Reggiana 1919 players
Parma Calcio 1913 players
Rimini F.C. 1912 players
Virtus Entella players
Serie C players
Serie D players